Stauffer Run is a  long 2nd order tributary to Jacobs Creek in Westmoreland County, Pennsylvania.

Course
Stauffer Run rises about 0.5 miles southwest of West Bethany, Pennsylvania, and then flows south to join Jacobs Creek at Scottdale.

Watershed
Stauffer Run drains  of area, receives about 42.1 in/year of precipitation, has a wetness index of 377.03, and is about 27% forested.

References

 
Tributaries of the Ohio River
Rivers of Pennsylvania
Rivers of Westmoreland County, Pennsylvania
Allegheny Plateau